Abramovo is a rural locality (a selo) and the administrative center of Abramovsky Selsoviet of Kuybyshevsky District, Novosibirsk Oblast, Russia. The population was 1222 as of 2010. There are 19 streets.

Geography 
Abramovo is located 7 km west of Kuybyshev (the district's administrative centre) by road. Kuybyshev is the nearest rural locality.

Ethnicity 
The village is inhabited by Russians.

References 

Rural localities in Novosibirsk Oblast